Leonid Mikoyam Fernandes Tavares (born 16 March 1981 in Praia, Santiago), aka Mikó, is a Cape Verdean footballer who plays for Praia Milfontes as a forward.

External links

1981 births
Living people
Sportspeople from Praia
Cape Verdean footballers
Association football forwards
Liga Portugal 2 players
Segunda Divisão players
Cypriot Second Division players
Akritas Chlorakas players
G.D. Estoril Praia players
Odivelas F.C. players
C.D. Olivais e Moscavide players